Anant Mahadevan (born 28 August 1950), also credited as Ananth Narayan Mahadevan, is an Indian screenwriter, actor, and film director of Malayalam, Hindi, Marathi, Tamil films and television shows. Having been an integral part of the Indian  television serials and Hindi films since the 1980s, he is also involved in the professional English and Hindi theatre.

Career
Ananth along with Sanjay Pawar received the National Award (2010) for the Best Screenplay and Dialogues for the successful Marathi movie Mee Sindhutai Sapkal. The film also fetched him the special jury award at the National Film awards 2010.

Mahadevan's film Gour Hari Dastaan was part of the Indian Panorama at the International Film Festival of India (2014) Goa, at the International Film Festival of Kerala IFFK (2014), the International Film Festival of Bangalore, and at the International Film Festival of Chennai (2014). 

Ananth plays the role of Damodar in the 2018 Hindi feature film Evening Shadows, directed by Sridhar Rangayan and produced by Solaris Pictures. He plays the role of a strict patriarch who has his set opinions and wants other members in his family - his wife Vasudha (Mona Ambegaonkar), sister Sarita (Yamini Singh) and son Kartik (Devansh Doshi) - to obey his commands.

Filmography

Director
Films
 Dil Vil Pyar Vyar (2002)
 Dil Maange More!!! (2004)
 Aksar (2006)
 Aggar: Passion Betrayal Terror (2007)
 Victoria No. 203: Diamonds Are Forever (2007)
 Anamika: The Untold Story (2008)
 Red Alert: The War Within (2009)
 Mee Sindhutai Sapkal (Marathi) (2010)
 Staying Alive (2012)
 The Storyteller (Upcoming film)
 The Xposé (2014 film)
 Gour Hari Dastaan (2015 film)
 RoughBook (2016)
 Doctor Rakhmabai (Marathi) (2016 film) based on Rukhmabai Bhimrao Raut
 Aksar 2 (2017)
 Bitter Sweet (2020) – Marathi film
 Life's Good (2022)
 Phule (upcoming) 
 The Confession (upcoming)

Television
 The Sword of Tipu Sultan (1990) –  Pandit Purnaiah
 Dekh Bhai Dekh (1994)
 Junoon (1994) as Advocate Vrinal Modi
 Ghar Jamai (1997)
 Zabaan Sambhalke (1997-1998) Season 2
 Jaan (1998-1999)
 Devi (2003)
 Mere Sai (2020) – Bal Gangadhar Tilak
Avrodh: The Siege Within  (2020–present)

Writer
 Dil Maange More!!! (2004) (story)
 Aksar (2006) (story)
 Anamika: The Untold Story (2008) (screenplay)
 Mee Sindhutai Sapkal (2010) (screenplay)

Actor

 Khandaan (1985) – Subbu
 Mazhe Ghar Mazha Sansar (1986) (Marathi Film) - Chintamani (special appearance)
 Isabella (1988) – Ananthu
 Chandni (1989) – Chandni's friend's husband 
Nachnewale Gaanewale (1991)
 Vishkanya (1991) – Bajrang
 Nagin Aur Lootere (1992) – Nagraj
 Khiladi (1992) – Neelam's Uncle
 Professor Ki Padosan (1993)
 Gardish (1993) – Havaldar Sawant
 Baazigar (1993) – Vishwanath Sharma (Ajay's father)
 Bedardi (1993) – Professor Harish Thakkar 
 Bhookamp (1993) – Akhtar
 Kanoon (1993) – Pasha Polyster (Vijay Saxena's assistant)
 Gangster (1994)
 Prem Yog (1994)
 Live Today
 God and Gun (1995)
 Janam Kundli (1995)
 Gaddaar (1995) – Mr. Saxena
 Hum Dono (1995)
 Akele Hum Akele Tum (1995)
 Vijeta (1996)
 Yes Boss
 Ishq
 Miss 420
 Pyaar To Hona Hi Tha
 Main Solah Baras Ki
 Kudrat (1998)
 Dil Kya Kare – DCP Krishan Kumar
 Mann – Creditor
 Baadshah (1999) (uncredited) – Seth. Mahendra
 Rhythm (2000; Tamil film)
 Shikaar (2004)
 Chhupa Rustam: A Musical Thriller
 Hum Ho Gaye Aap Ke
 Kyo Kii... Main Jhuth Nahin Bolta (2001)
 Tum Se Achcha Kaun Hai
 Aisaa Kyon
 Satta
 Joggers' Park
 Sandwich
 The Train: Some Lines Should Never Be Crossed...
 Aap Kaa Surroor – TV News Reporter
 Victoria No. 203: Diamonds Are Forever (2007) – Film Director
 Rafoo Chakkar: Fun on the Run (2008) – Harbans Singh
  EMI   (2008) – Babu
 8 x 10 Tasveer (2009) – Sundar Puri
 Na Ghar Ke Na Ghaat Ke (2010) – V.G Chunawala
 Staying Alive (2012)
 The Xposé (2014)
 Papanasam (2015; Tamil film)
 Kaccha Limbu (2017) as Venkatesh
 Aadat Se Majboor (TV Series) (2017–2018) as Roshan Lal Tootejaa/Darshan Lal Tootejaa
 Vishwaroopam 2/Vishwaroop 2 (2018; Tamil/Hindi film)
 Evening Shadows (2018) – Damodar
 2.0 (2018; Tamil film)
 Scam 1992 (2020)
 Durgamati (2020)
 Kaadan (2021; Tamil film)
 Forensic (2022) – Dr. Rajeev Gupta
 Indian 2 (2023; Tamil film)
 Salaam Venky (TBA; Hindi film)
 3 Monkeys (TBA; Hindi film)

References

External links
 

Male actors from Thrissur
Indian male film actors
Hindi-language film directors
Living people
Malayali people
Indian male screenwriters
Malayalam film directors
Film directors from Thrissur
21st-century Indian film directors
20th-century Indian male actors
21st-century Indian male actors
Male actors in Tamil cinema
Male actors in Hindi cinema
Marathi film directors
Screenwriters from Kerala
Best Adapted Screenplay National Film Award winners
1950 births